The Oakland Athletics' 2001 season was the team's 34th in Oakland, California, and the 101st season in franchise history. The team finished second in the American League West with a record of 102-60.

The Athletics entered the 2001 season with high expectations. Much of the excitement stemmed from the team's trio of promising young starting pitchers (Barry Zito, Mark Mulder, and Tim Hudson); after a strong showing in 2000, many expected the Athletics' rotation to rank among the American League's best in 2001. The signing of additional starter Cory Lidle during the 2000-01 offseason helped solidify the rotation's back-end. On offense, the Athletics were loaded; sluggers Miguel Tejada, Eric Chavez, and reigning American League MVP Jason Giambi comprised the core of a powerful Oakland attack. The addition of Johnny Damon, acquired in a three-way trade for Ben Grieve, promised to add a new dimension to the Athletics' offense. A strong bullpen (led by Chad Bradford, Jim Mecir, and Jason Isringhausen) rounded out Oakland's roster.

These high expectations quickly evaporated. The Athletics stumbled out of the gate (winning just two of their first dozen games); while their play nominally improved over the first half of the season, they failed to build upon the momentum of their division-winning 2000 campaign. The rival Seattle Mariners, in stark contrast, raced to a historic 52-14 start. As expected, the offense performed well; Oakland was instead hamstrung by unexpectedly terrible starting pitching. At the season's midpoint, the A's boasted a sub-.500 record (39-42); they trailed the division-leading Mariners by some 21 games.

The Athletics responded with arguably the most dominant second half in modern MLB history. Over their final 81 regular season games, the A's went 63-18 (a record since the league switched to a 162-game schedule); this included 29 wins in their final 33 games. The Athletics' maligned rotation returned to form; over their final games, Zito, Mulder, Hudson, and Lidle went a combined 48-10. On July 25, the Athletics acquired slugger Jermaine Dye from the Kansas City Royals for prospects; this move further energized the already-surging squad. The Athletics ultimately weren't able to catch up with Seattle (which won an AL-record 116 games), but their remarkable run allowed them to clinch the AL's Wild Card. The Athletics' 102 wins were at the time the most by a Wild Card clincher in MLB history.

The Athletics faced the New York Yankees (the three-time defending World Series champions) in the ALDS. Oakland took the first two games, but unraveled after a heartbreaking 1-0 loss in Game 3, in which Jeremy Giambi was infamously thrown out at the plate after a relay throw was flipped by Derek Jeter to Jorge Posada; they would lose the series to the Yankees in five games. At the end of the season, Oakland would lose Giambi, Damon, and Isringhausen to free agency; this would set the stage for the events portrayed in Michael Lewis' bestselling book Moneyball (and the film of the same name).

Offseason
 November 17, 2000: Randy Velarde was traded by the Athletics to the Texas Rangers for Aaron Harang and Ryan Cullen (minors).
 January 8, 2001: Ben Grieve was traded by the Athletics to the Tampa Bay Devil Rays, and Ángel Berroa and A. J. Hinch were traded by the Athletics to the Kansas City Royals as part of a three-team trade. The Royals sent Johnny Damon and Mark Ellis to the Athletics, and the Devil Rays sent Cory Lidle to the Athletics. The Devil Rays sent Roberto Hernández to the Royals.

Regular season

Season standings

Record vs. opponents

Notable transactions
 June 5, 2001: 2001 Major League Baseball draft
Neal Cotts was drafted by the Athletics in the 2nd round. Player signed June 13, 2001.
Dan Johnson was drafted by the Athletics in the 7th round. Player signed June 18, 2001.
 July 25, 2001: José Ortiz, Todd Belitz and Mario Encarnación were traded by the Athletics to the Colorado Rockies for Jermaine Dye.

Roster

Postseason
The A's lost 3-2 to the New York Yankees in the 2001 American League Division Series.

Player stats

Batting

Starters by position
Note: Pos = Position; G = Games played; AB = At bats; H = Hits; Avg. = Batting average; HR = Home runs; RBI = Runs batted in

Other batters
Note: G = Games played; AB = At bats; H = Hits; Avg = Batting average; HR = Home runs; RBI = Runs batted in

Pitching

Starting pitchers 
Note: G = Games; IP = Innings pitched; W = Wins; L = Losses; ERA = Earned run average; SO = Strikeouts

Relief pitchers 
Note: G = Games; W = Wins; L = Losses; SV = Saves; ERA = Earned run average; SO = Strikeouts

Awards and records
 Jason Giambi, Silver Slugger Award

Farm system 

LEAGUE CHAMPIONS: AZL Athletics

References

External links
2001 Oakland Athletics at Baseball Reference
2001 Oakland Athletics at Baseball Almanac

Oakland Athletics seasons
Oakland Athletics season
Oak